The Battle of Tarakan was the first stage in the Borneo campaign of 1945. It began with an amphibious landing by Allied forces on 1 May, code-named Operation Oboe One; the Allied ground forces were drawn mainly from the Australian 26th Brigade, but included a small element of Netherlands East Indies personnel. The main objective of the landing was the capture of the island's airfield. While the battle ended with success for the Allied forces over the Japanese defenders, this victory is generally regarded as having not justified its costs. The airfield was so heavily damaged that it ultimately could not be repaired in time to make it operational for other phases of the Allied campaign in Borneo.

Background

Geography
The coastal mangroves in the southern portion of the island were narrower. Tarakan is located three degrees north of the equator and has a tropical climate.

In 1945, Tarakan Town was the main settlement of the island. Four piers used to dock oil tankers were located on this coastline at the settlement of Lingkas, and were connected to Tarakan Town by three surfaced roads. The village of Djoeata was located on Tarakan's north-west coast and linked to Djoeata Oilfield by a track.

Japanese occupation
Prior to World War II, Tarakan formed part of the Netherlands East Indies (NEI) and was an important oil production centre. The island's two oilfields produced 80,000 barrels of oil per month in 1941. Securing Tarakan's oilfields formed one of Japan's early objectives during the Pacific War. Japanese forces landed on the island's east coast on 11 January 1942 and defeated the small Dutch garrison in two days of fighting in which half the defenders were killed. While the oilfields were successfully sabotaged by the Dutch before their surrender, Japanese engineers were able to swiftly restore them to production and 350,000 barrels were extracted each month by early 1944.

Following the Dutch surrender, Tarakan's 5,000 inhabitants suffered under Japan's occupation policies. The large number of troops stationed on the island caused food shortages and many civilians suffered from malnutrition as a result. The Japanese authorities brought 600 labourers to Tarakan from Java. The Japanese also forced an estimated 300 Javanese women to work as "comfort women" on Tarakan after enticing them to travel with false offers of clerical and clothes-making jobs.

Tarakan's value to the Japanese evaporated with the rapid advance of Allied forces into the area during 1944. The last Japanese oil tanker left Tarakan in July 1944, and heavy Allied air raids later in the year destroyed the island's oil production and storage facilities. Hundreds of Indonesian civilians may have also been killed by these raids. The Allies also laid mines near Tarakan, which, combined with patrols by air and naval units, prevented Japanese merchant vessels and transports from docking at the island.

In line with the island's declining importance, the Japanese garrison on Tarakan was reduced in early 1945. One of the two infantry battalions stationed on the island (the 454th Independent Infantry Battalion) was withdrawn to Balikpapan. This battalion was destroyed by the Australian 7th Division in July during the Battle of Balikpapan.

Allied plans
The primary objective for the Allied attack on Tarakan (code-named "Oboe One") was to secure and develop the island's airstrip so that it could be used to provide air cover for subsequent landings in Brunei, Labuan and Balikpapan. The secondary objective for the operation was to secure Tarakan's oilfields and bring them into operation as a source of oil for the Allied forces in the theatre. The 3rd Company, Technical Battalion, KNIL was responsible for this.

The 9th Division and 26th Brigade headquarters were responsible for planning the invasion of Tarakan. This work began in early March when both units had arrived at Morotai, and the final plans were completed on 24 April. The planners' work was hampered by poor working conditions and difficulties in communicating with General MacArthur's General Headquarters at Leyte. As part of the planning process each of Tarakan's hills was assigned a code name (for instance "Margy" and "Sykes"); during the Australian Army's campaigns in New Guinea geographic features had been named on an ad hoc basis, and it was hoped that selecting names prior to the battle would improve the precision of subsequent planning and communications.

The Allied plans anticipated that Tarakan would be secured quickly. It was expected that the operation would involve a short fight for the airfield followed by a 'consolidation' phase during which the island's airfield and port would be developed to support Allied operations. The planners did not foresee significant fighting in Tarakan's interior, and no plans were developed for operations in areas other than the landing beaches, Tarakan Town and airfield. The planners did, however, correctly anticipate that the Japanese would make their main stand in an area other than the invasion beach and would not be capable of mounting a large counterattack.

The Allied plans also expected that Tarakan would be transformed into a major base within days of the landing. Under the pre-invasion planning it was intended that a wing of fighter aircraft would be based at Tarakan six days after the landing and this force would be expanded to include an attack wing nine days later and staging facilities for a further four squadrons of aircraft within 21 days of the landing. It was also expected that the 26th Brigade Group and its supporting beach group would be ready to leave Tarakan by 21 May and the RAAF units could be redeployed in mid-June after providing support for the landing at Balikpapan.

The Allied planners possessed detailed intelligence on Tarakan and its defenders. This intelligence had been gathered from a variety of sources which included signals intelligence, photographic reconnaissance flights and Dutch colonial officials. Tarakan was the Australian Services Reconnaissance Department's (SRD) first priority from November 1944. Prior to the invasion, I Corps requested that the SRD provide intelligence on Japanese positions in northern and central Tarakan. A five-man strong party landed on the island on the night of 25/26 April and successfully reconnoitered the defences on Tarakan's north coast, though the operative who was assigned to the centre of the island became lost and did not reach this area. The SRD operatives withdrew from Tarakan on the night of 29/30 April and landed on the mainland of Borneo. They were unable to transmit the intelligence they had collected, however, as their radio set malfunctioned. Members of the party eventually landed within the Allied beachhead on Tarakan on 3 May to report to the 26th Brigade, but Whitehead was disappointed with the results of this operation and made no further use of the SRD during the battle.

Prelude

Opposing forces

Allies
The Allied force responsible for capturing Tarakan was centred around the very experienced Australian 26th Brigade Group of nearly 12,000 soldiers. The 26th Brigade had been formed in 1940 and had seen action in North Africa and New Guinea. The brigade's infantry component was the 2/23rd, 2/24th and 2/48th Battalions, also with much war experience. These battalions were joined by the 2/4th Commando Squadron and the 2/3rd Pioneer Battalion, which fought as infantry in this battle. The brigade group also included the 2/7th Field Regiment equipped with 24 25-pounder guns, a squadron from the 2/9th Armoured Regiment operating 18 Matilda tanks, a company of the 2/2nd Machine Gun Battalion, the 53rd Composite Anti-Aircraft Regiment and two engineer field squadrons. These combat units were supported by a large number of logistics and medical units, including the 2nd Beach Group whose role was to land supplies from the invasion fleet. While the 26th Brigade Group greatly outnumbered the known strength of Tarakan's Japanese defenders, the Allies committed this large force as their previous experience indicated that it would be difficult to defeat the Japanese force if it retreated into Tarakan's rugged interior.

The 26th Brigade Group was supported by Allied air and naval units. The air units were drawn from the Australian First Tactical Air Force (1 TAF) and United States Thirteenth Air Force and included fighter and bomber squadrons. The naval force was drawn from the United States Seventh Fleet and included several Royal Australian Navy warships and transports. Since the main objective of attacking Tarakan was to use the island's airstrip, the invasion force also included a large number of Royal Australian Air Force ground units, including No. 61 Airfield Construction Wing comprising No. 1 and No. 8 Airfield Construction Squadrons.

The force which landed on Tarakan included nearly a thousand United States and Dutch troops. The U.S. troops included the U.S. Army engineers who manned the invasion force's LCMs and LCVPs and the U.S. Army's 727th Amphibian Tractor Battalion, Co. A, who manned the LVTs and United States Navy Seabee detachments aboard the Landing Ship Tanks. The Dutch forces were organised into a company of Ambonese infantry commanded by Dutch officers and a civil affairs unit.

Japan
At the time of the Allied landing, the Japanese force on Tarakan numbered 2,200 men drawn from the Imperial Japanese Army and Imperial Japanese Navy. The largest unit was the 740-man strong 455th Independent Infantry Battalion which was commanded by Major Tadao Tokoi. 150 Army support troops were also on Tarakan. The Navy's contribution to Tarakan's garrison comprised 980 seamen commanded by Commander Kaoru Kaharu. The main naval unit was the 600-strong 2nd Naval Garrison Force. This naval unit was trained to fight as infantry and operated several coastal defence guns. The 350 Japanese civilian oil workers on Tarakan were also expected to fight in the event of an Allied attack. The Japanese force included about 50 Indonesians serving in a home guard unit. Major Tokoi directed the overall defence of Tarakan, though relations between the Army and Navy were poor.

The Japanese forces were concentrated around Lingkas, Tarakan's main port and the site of the only beaches suitable for landing troops. These defenders had spent the months before the invasion constructing defensive positions and laying mines. These fixed defences were used extensively during the battle, with Japanese tactics being focused on tenaciously defending pre-prepared positions. The Japanese did not conduct any large counter-attacks, and most offensive actions were limited to small parties of raiders which attempted to infiltrate the Australian lines.

Preparatory operations

The Japanese force on Tarakan was warned of the impending invasion in April, before the Allies began their pre-invasion bombardment of the island. The island's commander received a radio signal warning him of imminent attack, and the commander of Tarakan's oil depot was ordered to destroy the oil wells on 15 April. It is possible that this warning may have been issued as a result of a security leak from either the Chinese Republican Army's representative to Australia or MacArthur's headquarters. This did not have any effect on the subsequent battle, however, as the Japanese had been preparing defences to resist invasion for several months and the Japanese were aware of the large Allied force which was being assembled at Morotai to attack Borneo.

Prior to the arrival of the invasion force the Japanese garrison on Tarakan and Borneo was subjected to intensive air and naval attacks from 12 April to 29 April. The RAAF and USAAF also mounted air attacks against Japanese bases in China, French Indochina and the NEI to suppress Japanese air units throughout the region. These attacks destroyed all Japanese aircraft in the Tarakan area. The aerial bombing of Tarakan increased in intensity five days before the landing. These attacks were focused on the areas adjoining the planned landing beaches at Lingkas and sought to neutralise the Japanese defences in these areas. The oil storage tanks at Lingkas were a key objective as it was feared that the oil in these tanks could be ignited and used against Allied troops. These bombardments forced much of Tarakan's civilian population to flee inland. At least 100 civilians were killed or wounded.

The Tarakan attack force was assembled at Morotai during March and April 1945. The 26th Brigade Group was transported from Australia to Morotai by United States Army transports and arrived in mid-April and began to prepare their equipment for an amphibious landing. Due to a shortage of shipping all units were ordered to leave non-essential vehicles at Morotai when they began to embark onto assault transports on 20 April. The commander of the 1st Tactical Air Force attempted to resist this order, but was over-ridden by his superior officer Air Vice Marshal William Bostock. Most units were embarked by 22 April and the assault troops practiced landing operations for several days. A small convoy of ships carrying a force ordered to capture Sadau Island off the coast of Tarakan left Morotai on 26 April, and the main invasion convoy of 150 ships sailed the next day.

Due to the need to clear both the large number of naval mines which had been laid around Tarakan and the extensive beach obstacles at Lingkas, the Allies did not attempt a surprise landing. A group of United States Navy minesweepers and destroyers arrived off Tarakan on 27 April and began clearing mines, most of which had been originally laid by Allied aircraft. This operation was completed by 1 May at a cost of two small minesweepers damaged. USN PT boats also arrived off Tarakan on 28 April and illuminated and strafed the invasion beaches at night to prevent the Japanese from repairing their beach defences. The PT boats also attacked seven small Japanese freighters and luggers which were found anchored at Lingkas, sinking or damaging all but one of them.

On 30 April, the 2/4th Commando Squadron and the 57th Battery of the 2/7th Field Regiment were landed on the nearby Sadau Island in order to support the engineers tasked with clearing the obstacles off the invasion beaches. This force rapidly secured the undefended island. The landing on Sadau Island was the first time Australian soldiers had landed on non-Australian territory in the Pacific since late 1941 (Australian participation in the New Guinea Campaign from 1942 onwards was limited to the Australian portion of New Guinea). The only Allied losses in this operation were aboard , which was damaged when she struck a mine while supporting the landing.

The task of clearing the beach obstacles at Lingkas was assigned to the 2/13th Field Company. These defences comprised rows of barbed wire, wooden posts and steel rails which extended 125 yards from the beach. At 11:00 on 30 April, eight parties of engineers went forward in LVTs and landing craft to clear the obstacles. The engineers were supported by the guns on Sadau Island and Allied warships and aircraft. Operating under Japanese fire the engineers cleared all the obstacles obstructing the landing beaches. While heavy casualties had been expected, the 2/13th completed their task without loss.

Battle

Landing

The main invasion force arrived by sea off Tarakan in the early hours of 1 May. Supported by a heavy air and naval bombardment, the 2/23rd Battalion and the 2/48th Battalion made an amphibious landing at about 08:00. The 2/23rd Battalion disembarked from American LVTs into deep mud at "Green Beach" on the southern flank of the beachhead, and overcame several small Japanese positions in the hills around Lingkas. At nightfall it dug in along the main road to Tarakan Town (which had been designated the "Glenelg Highway" by the Australian planners). The 2/48th Battalion had a much easier landing at "Red Beach" on the northern end of the beachhead with most troops disembarking from their LVTs near dry land. The battalion pushed north along the "Anzac Highway" and nearby hills, and rapidly secured a number of pillboxes behind the beach as well as the oil storage tanks. By the end of the day the 2/48th held positions in the hills to the west of Tarakan Town. The 2/24th Battalion also began landing on Red Beach from 9.20 am, and spent most of the day in reserve. The unit received orders to advance north along the Anzac Highway late in the afternoon, but did not encounter any opposition. However, Japanese snipers were active within this perimeter during the night of 1/2 May, and the 2/2nd Pioneer Battalion (which formed the main unit of the 2nd Beach Group) fought several small battles with isolated Japanese forces. Allied casualties were lighter than expected, with 11 men killed and 35 wounded. The light Japanese resistance was attributed to the heavy pre-landing bombardment forcing Tarakan's defenders to abandon the formidable defences at Lingkas.

While the infantry were successful in securing a beachhead, the landing was hampered by the poor beach conditions. Many Australian vehicles became bogged in Lingkas Beach's soft mud, and seven LSTs were stranded after their commanders misjudged the ships'  beachings. The small amount of solid ground within the beachhead lead to severe congestion and resulted in none of 2/7th Field Regiment's guns being brought into action until the afternoon of the landing. The congestion was made worse by much of the RAAF ground force being landed on 1 May with large numbers of vehicles. The seven LSTs were not refloated until 13 May.

After securing the beachhead, the 26th Brigade Group advanced east into Tarakan Town and north towards the airstrip. The Australians encountered increasingly determined Japanese resistance as they moved inland. The task of capturing Tarakan's airstrip was assigned to the 2/24th Battalion. The Battalion's initial attack on the airstrip on the night of 2 May was delayed when the Japanese set off large explosive charges, and the airstrip was not secured until 5 May. While the capture of the airfield achieved the 26th Brigade Group's main task, the Japanese still held Tarakan's rugged interior.

During the first week of the invasion, 7,000 Indonesian refugees passed into the advancing Australian lines. This was a larger number than had been expected, and the refugees, many of whom were in poor health, overwhelmed the Dutch civil affairs unit. Despite the devastation caused by the Allied bombardment and invasion, most of the civilians welcomed the Australians as liberators. Hundreds of Indonesian civilians later worked as labourers and porters for the Allied force.

General Thomas Blamey, the commander of the Australian Military Forces, made an inspection tour of Tarakan on 8 May. During a meeting with Whitehead, Blamey directed that the 26th Brigade Group should "proceed in a deliberate manner" in clearing the rest of the island now that the main objectives of the invasion had been completed.

Securing the interior

In order to secure the island and protect the airstrip from attack, the 26th Brigade Group was forced to clear the Japanese from Tarakan's heavily forested hills. Approximately 1,700 Japanese troops were dug into positions in the north and centre of the island. These positions were protected by booby traps and mines. While attacking these positions necessarily entailed costly infantry fighting, the Australian troops made heavy use of their available artillery and air support to minimise casualties. The Australian tanks could only provide limited support to the infantry as Tarakan's thick jungle, swamps and steep hills often confined their movement to tracks and roads. As a result, tanks generally could not be used to spearhead attacks, and their role was limited to providing supporting fire for infantry assaults, with artillery being the preferred source of direct support.

The 2/3rd Pioneer Battalion and the NEI company were assigned responsibility for securing the south-eastern portion of Tarakan. The pioneers began advancing east of Tarakan Town on 7 May but encountered unexpectedly strong Japanese resistance. From 10 May, the battalion was halted at the 'Helen' feature, which was defended by about 200 Japanese troops. On 12 May Corporal John Mackey was killed after capturing three Japanese machine gun posts. Mackey was posthumously awarded the Victoria Cross for this act. During the fighting at 'Helen' B-24 Liberator heavy bombers were used for close air support for the first time, with P-38 Lightning fighters dropping napalm immediately after the bombing. This combination proved particularly effective, and became the standard form of air support requested by the Australians. The Japanese force withdrew from 'Helen' on 14 May after suffering approximately 100 casualties, and the 2/3rd Pioneer Battalion reached Tarakan's eastern shore on 16 May. The battalion suffered 20 killed and 46 wounded in this operation. During this period the NEI company secured the remainder of southern Tarakan, and encountered little resistance during its advance.

The United States and Australian navies continued to support the invasion once the landing was complete. USN PT boats sank at least a dozen small craft off Tarakan and in rivers on the coast of Borneo between 1 and 10 May. The PT boats carried Netherlands Indies Civil Administration interpreters on most patrols who interrogated natives to gather information on Japanese movements. The Japanese battery at Cape Djoeata on Tarakan's north coast was also knocked out by USS Douglas A. Munro on 23 May.

The Japanese garrison was gradually destroyed, with the survivors abandoning their remaining positions in the hills and withdrawing to the north of the island on 14 June. On this day 112 Chinese and Indonesian labourers left the Japanese-held area with a note from a senior Japanese officer asking that they be well treated. While Radio Tokyo announced that Tarakan had fallen on 15 June, the last organised Japanese resistance was encountered on 19 June and Whitehead did not declare the island secure until 21 June.

Construction problems

While the infantry of the 26th Brigade Group fought the Japanese in the hills, the RAAF engineers of No. 61 Airfield Construction Wing were engaged in a desperate effort to bring Tarakan's airstrip into operation. As the airstrip had been heavily damaged by pre-invasion bombing and lay in marshy terrain it proved much more difficult to repair than had been expected, and it took eight weeks and not the expected single week to restore the strip to a usable state. Extensive use was made of Marston Mat, interlocking steel plates laid down like matting. Remnants of the plates still exist in the car park at Tarakan airport.

While the airstrip was finally opened on 28 June, this was too late for it to play any role in supporting the landings in Brunei or Labuan (10 June), or the landings at Balikpapan. However No. 78 Wing RAAF was based on Tarakan from 28 June and flew in support of the Balikpapan operation until the end of the war.

Efforts to restart production at Tarakan's oilfields were delayed by serious damage to the facilities and Japanese holdouts, and they did not become operational until after the war.

Mopping up

Following the end of organised resistance the surviving Japanese on Tarakan split into small parties which headed to the north and east of the island. The 26th Brigade Group's main combat units were allocated sections of Tarakan which they swept for Japanese. Many Japanese attempted to cross the strait separating Tarakan from the mainland but were intercepted by Allied naval patrols. Allied troops also searched for Japanese on Bunyu Island, fifteen miles north-east of Tarakan.

From the first week of July the surviving Japanese became short of food and attempted to return to their old positions in the centre of the island and raid Australian positions in search of food. As their hunger increased more Japanese surrendered. The Australian units continued to patrol in search of Japanese until the end of the war, with several Japanese being killed or surrendering each day. These operations cost the 26th Brigade Group a further 36 casualties between June 21 and August 15. Approximately 300 Japanese soldiers evaded the Allied patrols, and surrendered at the end of the war in mid-August.

Aftermath

The 26th Brigade Group remained on Tarakan as an occupation force until 27 December 1945, though most of its units were disbanded in October. The Brigade's headquarters returned to Australia in early 1946 and was formally disbanded at Brisbane in January 1946.

Tarakan's oilfields were swiftly repaired and brought back into production. Engineers and technicians arrived shortly after the Allied landing and the first oil pump was restored on 27 June. By October the island's oilfields were producing 8,000 barrels per day and providing employment for many Tarakanese civilians.

The Allied units committed to the battle carried out their tasks with "skill and professionalism". In summing up the operation Samuel Eliot Morison wrote that "altogether this was a very well conducted amphibious operation which attained its objectives with minimum loss". The Battle of Tarakan emphasised the importance of combined arms warfare, and especially the need for infantry to cooperate with and be supported by tanks, artillery and engineers during jungle warfare.

Despite Morison's judgement, the 26th Brigade Group's casualties were high in comparison to the other landings in the Borneo campaign. The Brigade suffered more than twice the casualties the 9th Division's other two Brigades suffered during their operations in North Borneo and 23 more fatalities than the 7th Division incurred at Balikpapan. The 26th Brigade Group's higher losses may be attributable to Tarakan's garrison not being able to withdraw as the garrisons in North Borneo and Balikpapan did.

The landing force's achievements were nullified by the fact that the island's airfield could not be brought into action. The faulty intelligence assessment which led the RAAF planners to believe that the airfield could be repaired represented a major failing. Moreover, the RAAF's performance at Tarakan was often poor. This performance may have resulted from the low morale prevalent in many units and the 'Morotai Mutiny' disrupting 1 TAF's leadership.

As with the rest of the Borneo campaign, the Australian operations on Tarakan remain controversial. Debate continues over whether the campaign was a meaningless "sideshow", or whether it was justified in the context of the planned operations to both invade Japan and liberate the rest of the Netherlands East Indies, which were both scheduled to begin in 1946. The Australian official historian Gavin Long's judgement that "the results achieved did not justify the cost of the Tarakan operation" is in accordance with the generally held view on the battle.

Notes

See also
Naval Base Borneo
Operation Semut
Operation Agas
Western New Guinea campaign
US Naval Advance Bases

References

Further reading

External links

 Operations instructions no 99, Tarakan Island, March 1945

Tarakan 1945
Tarakan
Tarakan 1945
Tarakan 1945
Japanese occupation of the Dutch East Indies
Borneo campaign
May 1945 events in Asia
June 1945 events in Asia
1945 in the Dutch East Indies
History of North Kalimantan
Tarakan